The following highways are numbered 30:

International
 Asian Highway 30
 European route E30

Australia
 Albany Highway (State Route 30, Western Australia)

Brazil
 BR-030

Canada
 Alberta Highway 30 (defunct)
 British Columbia Highway 30
 Manitoba Highway 30
 Newfoundland and Labrador Route 30
 Cabot Trail, also known as Nova Scotia Trunk 30
 Ontario Highway 30 (former)
 Quebec Autoroute 30
 Saskatchewan Highway 30

China 
  G30 Expressway

Czech Republic
 I/30 Highway; Czech: Silnice I/30

India

Ireland
  N30 road (Ireland)

Italy
 Autostrada A30

Japan
 Japan National Route 30
 Seto-Chūō Expressway

Korea, South
 Dangjin–Yeongdeok Expressway
 National Route 30
Gukjido 30

New Zealand
  New Zealand State Highway 30
  New Zealand State Highway 30A

United Kingdom
 British A30 (Penzance-London)

Turkey
  Otoyol 30

Ukraine
 Highway M30 (Ukraine)

United Arab Emirates
 E 30 road (United Arab Emirates)

United States
 Interstate 30
 U.S. Route 30
 U.S. Route 30N (disambiguation), several former sections
 U.S. Route 30S (disambiguation), several former sections
 New England Route 30 (former)
 Alabama State Route 30
 Arizona State Route 30
Arkansas Highway 30 (1926–1958) (former)
 California State Route 30 (former)
 County Route J30 (California)
 County Route S30 (California)
 Colorado State Highway 30
 Connecticut Route 30
 Delaware Route 30
 Florida State Road 30
 Florida State Road 30E
 Georgia State Route 30
 Hawaii Route 30
 Illinois Route 30 (former)
 K-30 (Kansas highway)
 Kentucky Route 30
 Louisiana Highway 30
 Louisiana State Route 30-E (former)
 Maryland Route 30
Maryland Route 30BC
Maryland Route 30BZ
Maryland Route 30C (former)
Maryland Route 30D (former)
 Massachusetts Route 30
 M-30 (Michigan highway)
 Minnesota State Highway 30
 County Road 30 (Chisago County, Minnesota)
 County Road 30 (Dakota County, Minnesota)
 County Road 30 (Hennepin County, Minnesota)
 County Road 30 (Ramsey County, Minnesota)
 Mississippi Highway 30
 Missouri Route 30
Nebraska Highway 30 (former)
 Nebraska Spur 30B
 Nebraska Spur 30C
 Nebraska Spur 30D
 Nebraska Spur 30H
 Nevada State Route 30 (former)
 New Jersey Route 30 (former)
 County Route 30 (Bergen County, New Jersey)
 County Route 30 (Monmouth County, New Jersey)
 County Route 30 (Ocean County, New Jersey)
 New Mexico State Road 30
 New York State Route 30
 County Route 30 (Cattaraugus County, New York)
 County Route 30 (Chenango County, New York)
 County Route 30 (Delaware County, New York)
 County Route 30 (Dutchess County, New York)
 County Route 30 (Erie County, New York)
 County Route 30 (Essex County, New York)
 County Route 30 (Genesee County, New York)
 County Route 30 (Montgomery County, New York)
 County Route 30 (Otsego County, New York)
 County Route 30 (Putnam County, New York)
 County Route 30 (Rockland County, New York)
 County Route 30 (Schenectady County, New York)
 County Route 30 (Schoharie County, New York)
 County Route 30 (Suffolk County, New York)
 County Route 30 (Ulster County, New York)
 County Route 30 (Washington County, New York)
 County Route 30 (Westchester County, New York)
 County Route 30 (Yates County, New York)
 North Carolina Highway 30
 North Dakota Highway 30
 Ohio State Route 30 (1923-1927) (former)
 Oklahoma State Highway 30
 South Carolina Highway 30
 South Dakota Highway 30
 Tennessee State Route 30
 Texas State Highway 30
 Texas State Highway Spur 30
 Farm to Market Road 30
 Texas Park Road 30
 Utah State Route 30
 Vermont Route 30
 Virginia State Route 30
 Washington State Route 30 (former)
 Wisconsin Highway 30
 Wyoming Highway 30

Territories
 Puerto Rico Highway 30
 U.S. Virgin Islands Highway 30

Vietnam 
 National Road 30 (Vietnam)

See also 
 List of A30 roads
 List of highways numbered 30A